James "Jumping Jim" Halliday (19 January 1918 – 6 June 2007) was a weightlifter from  Great Britain.

Weightlifting career
He competed for Great Britain in the 1948 Summer Olympics held in London, United Kingdom in the lightweight event where he finished third behind the winner, the outstanding Egyptian lifter Ibrahim Shams.

He represented England and won a gold medal in the -67.5 kg division at the 1950 British Empire Games in Auckland, New Zealand. Four years later he repeated the feat by winning another gold medal at the 1954 British Empire and Commonwealth Games in Vancouver, Canada.

Personal life

Halliday's participation was remarkable as he had been a prisoner of war in the Far East from 1942 to 1945 having been captured when Singapore fell to the Japanese on 15 February 1942. During his imprisonment, he managed to lift a barbell (which had been made from wood) over his head, something which the other British prisoners (or the Japanese guards) could not manage. As a result of this, the Japanese commander cut the British prisoners' food rations as he believed they were getting too strong. He had weighed little more than 6 stone (38 kg) after three years as a PoW, including working on the Burma Railway. Halliday subsequently won two British Empire titles in 1950 and 1954.

He worked on the coal gang at Kearsley Power Station and later became the Electricity Board's chief safety officer, travelling around the country lecturing men on how to lift heavy bags or dig holes.

References

1918 births
English male weightlifters
Olympic weightlifters of Great Britain
Olympic bronze medallists for Great Britain
Weightlifters at the 1948 Summer Olympics
Weightlifters at the 1952 Summer Olympics
Commonwealth Games gold medallists for England
Weightlifters at the 1950 British Empire Games
Weightlifters at the 1954 British Empire and Commonwealth Games
People from Farnworth
2007 deaths
Olympic medalists in weightlifting
British Army personnel of World War II
British World War II prisoners of war
World War II prisoners of war held by Japan
Burma Railway prisoners
Medalists at the 1948 Summer Olympics
Commonwealth Games medallists in weightlifting
Medallists at the 1950 British Empire Games
Medallists at the 1954 British Empire and Commonwealth Games